Amy Lau is a contemporary interior designer and co-founder of the Design Miami fair. Lau has been a featured designer in Luxe Magazine, New York Spaces, Open House, and HGTV.

Biography
Lau was born in Arizona and currently resides in New York City, where she has established her interior design firm. The firm, Amy Lau Design, is located in the West Chelsea arts district.  Prior to the development of her own design firm, Lau received a degree in Art History, and a master's degree in fine and decorative arts from Sotheby's Graduate program.

Career
In 2001, Lau launched her interior design firm and continued to serve as an independent adviser to decorative arts collectors of the 20th Century.

Following her degree in Art History, she received a master's degree in Fine and Decorative Arts from Sotheby's graduate program in New York. Lau was awarded an honorary doctorate from The New York School of Interior Design in 2012, and was the keynote speaker for the college's 175 graduating candidates.

In 2005, Lau co-founded the Design Miami fair, which assembles galleries specializing in design from the post-war period to the present. Established to run in conjunction with Art Basel Miami Beach, the Design Miami fair has expanded to become a forum for exhibiting, discussing, creating, and collecting designs.  In 2011, Amy Lau Design published a monograph.  During 2010–2011, Lau was a spokesperson for Benjamin Moore's print, television, and online campaign "Paint with the Very Best".

The firm recently expanded to include retail design with an Elie Tahari fashion boutique that was published in Interior Design magazine. Amy Lau and her residential interiors have also been featured in publications such as Architectural Digest (Nov. 2013, Nov. 2016), Metropolitan Home, Elle Decor, The New York Times, Hamptons Cottages & Gardens (cover), Luxe (cover), New York Spaces, Gotham, and House & Garden.

References

American interior designers
Living people
Artists from New York City
People from Arizona
American designers
Year of birth missing (living people)
American women interior designers
21st-century American women